Matthew Kenyon (born 1977) is an American new media artist and director of the art practice, S.W.A.M.P. (Studies of Work Atmosphere and Mass Production). Kenyon focuses on critical themes addressing global corporate operations, mass media, military-industrial complexes, and the liminal area between reality and artificial life.

Biography 
Matthew Kenyon received his BFA from Southeastern Louisiana State University in 1999 and his MFA from Virginia Commonwealth University in 2002. He is currently the director of the graduate program at the University at Buffalo department of art. He was previously associate professor of art at the University of Michigan's Penny W. Stamps School of Art & Design and associate professor at the Rhode Island School of Design (RISD).

In 1999, Kenyon founded S.W.A.M.P. with fellow artist Douglas Easterly. The pair operated S.W.A.M.P. as a collaborative partnership until 2012, when Kenyon assumed full creative direction of the practice. Their work, The Notepad (2007) is in the permanent collection at the Museum of Modern Art (MoMA).

In 2015, Kenyon was awarded fellowships at TED and the Macdowell colony.

Select exhibitions 
 2015: GLOBALE: Infosphere, ZKM | Museum of Contemporary Art Karlsruhe, Germany
 2015: TED Global, Vancouver, Canada
 2015: Illusion, Science Gallery, Petrosains Science Centre, Kuala Lumpur, Malaysia
 2014: State of Emergency, Van Every Gallery, Belk Visual Arts Center at Davidson College, North Carolina
 2013: (In)Habitation, Museum of Contemporary Art Detroit (MoCAD). Detroit, Michigan
 2012: Flash Crash, Katzen Arts Center, Washington D.C.
 2012: In Search of the Miraculous, SIGGRAPH Art Gallery, Los Angeles.
 2011: Talk to Me, The Museum of Modern Art, (MoMA). New York City. 
 2010: FILE Prix 2010, Centro Cultural FIESP, São Paulo, Brazil
 2009: End of Oil, Exit Art, A project of SEA (Social-Environmental Aesthetics), New York City
 2006: FILE 2006 International Symposium of Electronic Language, São Paulo, Brazil

References

External links 
Official Website
"A secret memorial for civilian casualties" TED Talk, March 2015. 
A Touch of Code,  ed. Verena Hanschke (Berlin: Gestalten Press, 2011).  
DiSalvo, Carlo. Adversarial Design. Cambridge: The MIT Press, 2012.

BioArtists
American contemporary artists
New media artists
Living people
1977 births
Southeastern Louisiana University alumni
Virginia Commonwealth University alumni
American sculptors
University at Buffalo faculty